Ropica coenosa is a species of beetle in the family Cerambycidae. It was described by Matsushita in 1933. It is known from Japan.

References

coenosa
Beetles described in 1933